One Who's Been a Sailor (Spanish: Uno que ha sido marino) is a 1951 Chilean comedy film directed by José Bohr and starring Eugenio Retes, Hilda Sour and Arturo Gatica.

Cast
 Eugenio Retes as Zepeda  
 Hilda Sour as Maruja  
 Arturo Gatica as Silvano  
 Eduardo Naveda 
 Eva González 
 Rolando Caicedo 
 Elena Moreno
 Arturo Gonzalvez

References

Bibliography 
 Carlos Ossa Coo. Historia del cine chileno. Empresa Editora Nacional Quimantú, 1971.

External links 
 

1951 films
1951 comedy films
Chilean comedy films
1950s Spanish-language films
Chilean black-and-white films
Films directed by José Bohr